The Reverend George Dupuis (1757 – 5 March 1839) was an English minister who was active as a cricketer in the 1780s and 1790s, making five known appearances in first-class matches. His batting and bowling styles are unknown.

Dupuis is first recorded playing for Hornchurch against Moulsey Hurst Cricket Club at Moulsey Hurst in July 1787. In August of the same year, he was in the Hornchurch/Essex team for the return match at Langton Park, in which Moulsey Hurst combined with the White Conduit Club (WCC; the match has also been titled "Essex v WCC"). No scorecard has survived although the teams and the result are known. It is in this teamsheet that Dupuis is termed The Reverend Mr Dupuis.

He played in two successive matches at Lord's Old Ground in May and June 1791, first for an Old Etonians cricket team (having been educated at Eton College) against the Gentlemen of England; secondly for Marylebone Cricket Club (MCC) against the Gentlemen of Kent (this game being Lord Frederick Beauclerk's debut at Lord's). In August 1792, Dupuis made his last known first-class appearance for MCC against Berkshire at the Old Field ground.

Footnotes

References

Bibliography
 
 
 
 

1757 births
1839 deaths
English cricketers
Essex cricketers
Hornchurch Cricket Club cricketers
Marylebone Cricket Club cricketers
Old Etonians cricketers
People educated at Eton College
English cricketers of 1787 to 1825